Clear is the third studio album by English electronic music act Bomb the Bass released on 3 April 1995 by 4th & B'way Records.

Release
Clear was released on 3 April 1995 by 4th & B'way Records. It peaked at number 22 on the UK Albums Chart.

"Bug Powder Dust" was issued as the lead single from Clear on 19 September 1994, peaking at number 24 on the UK Singles Chart. "Dark Heart" followed later that year, reaching number 35 on the chart. A further two singles were released in 1995: "One to One Religion" on 20 March, and "Sandcastles" on 4 September. They charted in the UK at numbers 53 and 54 respectively.

Critical reception

NME named Clear the 42nd best album of 1995. In 2015, Fact placed the record at number 49 on its list of the best trip hop albums of all time.

Track listing

Sample credits
 "Bug Powder Dust" contains samples of Naked Lunch.

Personnel
Credits are adapted from the album's liner notes.

Musicians

 Tim Simenon – drum programming, sampling
 Carlton – vocals (track 3)
 Dave Clayton – keyboards (tracks 1, 3–11), keyboard effects (tracks 10, 11), sampling (track 8), additional sampling (tracks 3–7)
 Danny Cummings – percussion (tracks 3, 4, 9–11)
 Bernard Fowler – vocals (track 9)
 Ivor Guest – drum programming (track 10), keyboard effects (track 10), sampling (track 10)
 Adam Holden – bass (track 10), additional programming (track 6), additional sampling (track 6)
 Kenji Jammer – guitar (tracks 2, 3)
 Keith LeBlanc – drum programming (tracks 2, 9), drums (track 4), sampling (tracks 2, 9)
 Inder "Goldfinger" Matharu – percussion (track 2)
 Skip McDonald – guitar (tracks 2, 9, 11), backing vocals (track 2)
 Sinéad O'Connor – vocals (track 11)
 River – vocals (track 10)
 Atticus Ross – programming (tracks 1, 7), drum programming (track 10), sampling (track 10), additional programming (track 6), additional sampling (tracks 1, 6, 7)
 Claudia Sarne – bass (track 6)
 Jeff Scantlebury – percussion (track 2)
 Will Self – vocals (track 7)
 Bim Sherman – vocals (track 2)
 Sista Joy – backing vocals (track 4)
 Spikey T – vocals (track 4)
 Justin Warfield – vocals (tracks 1, 6)
 Doug Wimbish – bass (tracks 1, 9, 11), bass effects (track 11)
 Leslie Winer – vocals (track 5)
 Jah Wobble – bass (track 7)
 Benjamin Zephaniah – vocals (track 11)

Production

 Tim Simenon – production, mixing
 Don Hozz – programming engineering
 Keith LeBlanc – production (track 2), mixing (track 2)
 Lee Boy – assistance
 Mike Marsh – mastering
 Q – mix engineering, recording
 Tom – assistance
 Doug Wimbish – production (track 9), mixing (track 9)

Design

 Richard Baker – editing
 The Baron von Kallstein – photography
 Cally on U Art – artwork, design
 Rob Crane – typography
 Phil Smee – photography

Charts

References

External links
 

1995 albums
Bomb the Bass albums
Albums produced by Tim Simenon
Albums produced by Keith LeBlanc
4th & B'way Records albums